Ivar Jacobsen Norevik (26 March 1900 – 18 March 1956) was a Norwegian politician for the Labour Party.

He was born in Lavik og Brekke.

He was elected to the Norwegian Parliament from Sogn og Fjordane in 1945, and was re-elected on two occasions. Midway through the third term, he died and was replaced by Edvard Anderson Solheim.

Norevik was deputy member of Kyrkjebø municipality council in the period 1937–1940.

References

1900 births
1956 deaths
Labour Party (Norway) politicians
Members of the Storting
20th-century Norwegian politicians